Steven Kwan (born September 5, 1997) is an American professional baseball outfielder for the Cleveland Guardians of Major League Baseball (MLB). He made his MLB debut in 2022.

Born and raised in the San Francisco Bay Area, Kwan played three years of college baseball at Oregon State University before being selected by the Cleveland Indians in the fifth round of the 2018 MLB draft. He was a member of their minor league system for four years before making Cleveland's Opening Day roster in 2022, quickly becoming a part of their starting lineup, playing all three outfield positions. Following the conclusion of his rookie year, he earned a Gold Glove Award for his defense in left field and was a finalist of American League Rookie of the Year.

Amateur career

Kwan attended Washington High School in Fremont, California, where he batted .462 as a senior in 2015. After graduating, he enrolled at Oregon State University where he played college baseball for the Beavers. As a freshman in 2016, he played in 35 games in which he hit .215. He later said that, as a freshman, he did not feel he belonged at Oregon State among their "high recruits." He sat out two months of the season and had to visit with a sports psychologist. His play improved in 2017 as a sophomore and he appeared in 55 games (making 42 starts), batting .331 with one home run, 18 runs batted in (RBIs), six doubles, and eight stolen bases. After the 2017 season, he played collegiate summer baseball with the Wareham Gatemen of the Cape Cod Baseball League. As a junior in 2018, Kwan played in 66 games and hit .355/.463/.457 with two home runs, 41 RBIs, and 14 stolen bases. He batted leadoff ahead of Nick Madrigal, Trevor Larnach and Adley Rutschman and helped lead the Beavers to a national championship in the 2018 College World Series. After his junior year, he was selected by the Cleveland Indians in the fifth round of the 2018 Major League Baseball draft.

Professional career

Minor leagues

Kwan signed with the Guardians organization when it was still known as the Indians, made his professional debut with the Arizona League Indians and was later promoted to the Mahoning Valley Scrappers, hitting a combined .346 over 17 games between the two clubs. In 2019, he played with the Lynchburg Hillcats, batting .280 with three home runs, 39 RBIs, and 26 doubles over 123 games. 

He did not play a game in 2020 due to the cancellation of the minor league season caused by the COVID-19 pandemic. Kwan began the 2021 season with the Akron RubberDucks and was promoted to the Columbus Clippers in late August. He missed six weeks during the season due to a strained right hamstring. Over 77 games between the two clubs, Kwan slashed .328/.407/.527 with 12 home runs and 44 RBIs. The newly named Cleveland Guardians selected Kwan to their 40-man roster on November 19, 2021.

2022 - Rookie season
On April 2, 2022, the Guardians announced that Kwan had been named to the Opening Day roster. He made his MLB debut on Opening Day as the starting right fielder on April 7, and recorded his first major league hit off Kansas City Royals reliever Scott Barlow. After making his debut, he became just the sixth player since at least 1901 to have a five-hit game within his first three major league games, and also became the first player since at least 1901 to reach base safely 15 times in his first four games. He saw 116 pitches before he swung and missed, the most for any batter to start his career since 2000. 

Kwan was named American League Rookie of the Month for April and September 2022. He hit his first major league home run on May 5 off of José Berríos.

In 2022, Kwan had the lowest percentage of hard-hit balls in the majors (18.9%), the highest called-strike percentage in the majors (24.5%), and batted .298/.373/.400 with six home runs, 52 RBIs, 19 stolen bases, and 25 doubles alongside 62 walks and 60 strikeouts over 147 games. Kwan's 62 walks compared to 60 strikeouts made him the first rookie to record more walks than strikeouts since Dustin Pedroia in 2007. On defense, Kwan was awarded the American League's left field Gold Glove Award. He was named a finalist for the American League Rookie of the Year Award, alongside Adley Rutschman and Julio Rodríguez.

Personal life
Kwan is of Chinese and Japanese descent.

References

External links

1997 births
Living people
People from Los Gatos, California
Baseball players from California
Major League Baseball outfielders
Cleveland Guardians players
Gold Glove Award winners
Oregon State Beavers baseball players
Wareham Gatemen players
Arizona League Indians players
Mahoning Valley Scrappers players
Lynchburg Hillcats players
Akron RubberDucks players
Columbus Clippers players
American baseball players of Chinese descent
American baseball players of Japanese descent